Francis Berkeley may refer to:

 Francis Berkeley (Shrewsbury MP) (1583–?), English lawyer and MP for Shrewsbury
 Francis Henry FitzHardinge Berkeley (1794–1870), English MP for Bristol
 Francis Berkeley, 2nd Baron FitzHardinge (1826–1896), English MP for Cheltenham, nephew of the above